Ptilogyna is a genus of true crane fly.

Distribution
Australia, Brazil, New Caledonia & Papua New Guinea.

Species
Subgenus Ctenogyna Macquart, 1838
P. bicolor (Macquart, 1838)
P. nasalis (Alexander, 1924)
Subgenus Plusiomyia Skuse, 1890
P. clarki (Alexander, 1928)
P. felix (Alexander, 1922)
P. flabellifera Loew, 1851
P. gracilis (Walker, 1848)
P. herroni (Alexander, 1948)
P. inornata (Skuse, 1890)
P. kraussiana (Alexander, 1966)
P. leucoplagia (Alexander, 1957)
P. lineata (Skuse, 1890)
P. mackerrasi (Alexander, 1928)
P. margaritae (Alexander, 1948)
P. mathesonae Dobrotworsky, 1971
P. minor (Alexander, 1922)
P. necopina (Alexander, 1922)
P. neocaledonica (Alexander, 1948)
P. neogama (Alexander, 1944)
P. olliffi (Skuse, 1890)
P. pandoxa (Alexander, 1922)
P. spissigrada (Alexander, 1922)
P. tasmaniensis (Alexander, 1922)
P. tripectinata (Alexander, 1922)
P. wellsi (Alexander, 1950)
P. westralis Dobrotworsky, 1971
Subgenus Ptilogyna Westwood, 1835
P. cheesmanae Alexander, 1947
P. macquartii Loew, 1851
P. minima Alexander, 1922
P. ramicornis (Walker, 1835)

References

Tipulidae
Diptera of Australasia
Diptera of South America